Ádám Vass (born 9 September 1988) is a Hungarian footballer who plays as a defensive midfielder for Soroksár.

Career
On 21 June 2019 it was confirmed, that Vass had joined Gyirmót FC Győr.

Club statistics

Updated to games played as of 15 May 2022.

International career
Vass has played for Hungary at under-17 and under-19 levels. On 15 November 2006, Vass made his début for the Hungary senior side against Canada. He became the youngest ever Stoke City player to become a full international until Dale Eve broke his record on 4 November 2011, aged 16.

Honours
 Serie B: Third place 2009–10
 Young Hungarian Player of the Year: 2007

External links
Ádám Vass fan site (In English)

References

1988 births
Sportspeople from Fejér County
Living people
Hungarian footballers
Hungary international footballers
Hungary youth international footballers
Hungary under-21 international footballers
Association football midfielders
Ferencvárosi TC footballers
Stoke City F.C. players
Brescia Calcio players
CFR Cluj players
K.V. Oostende players
MTK Budapest FC players
Gyirmót FC Győr players
Soroksár SC players
Serie A players
Serie B players
Liga I players
Belgian Pro League players
Nemzeti Bajnokság I players
Nemzeti Bajnokság II players
Hungarian expatriate footballers
Expatriate footballers in England
Hungarian expatriate sportspeople in England
Expatriate footballers in Italy
Hungarian expatriate sportspeople in Italy
Expatriate footballers in Romania
Hungarian expatriate sportspeople in Romania
Expatriate footballers in Belgium
Hungarian expatriate sportspeople in Belgium